Lieutenant General Andrew Thomas Blayney, 11th Baron Blayney (30 November 1770 – 8 April 1834) was an Anglo-Irish peer. He ruled the Blayney estate at Castleblayney, County Monaghan for fifty years from 1784 to 1834, and was one of the most illustrious soldiers ever to come from County Monaghan.

As commanding officer of the 89th Regiment of Foot, 'Blayney's Bloodhounds' as they were called, he fought with distinction in the Napoleonic Wars.  He was taken prisoner at the Battle of Fuengirola, when making a raid from Gibraltar into Spain against a small group of Polish soldiers a tenth his number, and was kept prisoner for four years by the French government. His sabre is currently on exhibition in the Czartoryski Museum, in Kraków.

He wrote a two-volume account of his experiences in the Napoleonic Wars - Narrative of a Forced Journey through Spain and France as a Prisoner of War in the Years 1810 to 1814, by Major-General Lord Blayney (London, 1814). He was captured by one of the O'Callaghans of Cullaville, a colonel in the French army and a prominent United Irishman who escaped after 1798. It is said he insisted on Blayney being held to ransom for some of the United Irishmen who were in British prisons.

During Blayney's long incarceration, the 2nd Earl of Caledon looked after his financial, domestic, and political affairs, and on his return, Blayney was given a seat in parliament for Caledon's infamous "rotten borough" of Old Sarum, Wiltshire.

Lord Blayney died on 8 April 1834 and was succeeded by his son Cadwallader, the 12th and last lord.

See also 
 Baron Blayney

References

External links
 The Blayney of Castleblayney Papers - Public Record Office of Northern Ireland
 The Battle of Fuengirola 1810 - Lord Blayney's Narrative

1770 births
1834 deaths
People from County Monaghan
Members of the Parliament of the United Kingdom for English constituencies
Barons Blayney
British Army lieutenant generals
British Army personnel of the Napoleonic Wars
UK MPs 1806–1807
UK MPs who inherited peerages
Napoleonic Wars prisoners of war held by France
Royal Irish Fusiliers officers
British prisoners of war (Napoleonic Wars)